Montaqua is a census-designated place (CDP) in Carbon County, Montana, United States. It is in the northern part of the county, along U.S. Route 212, which leads northeast  to Laurel and southwest  to Red Lodge. Montaqua is on the north side of Rock Creek, a northeast-flowing tributary of the Clarks Fork Yellowstone River. The community is bordered to the northeast by Rockvale.

Montaqua was first listed as a CDP prior to the 2020 census.

Demographics

References 

Census-designated places in Carbon County, Montana
Census-designated places in Montana